The River Stort is a river in Essex and Hertfordshire, England. It is 24 miles (38 km) long and flows from just south of the village of Langley to the River Lea at Hoddesdon.

The river's name is a back-formation; the town of Bishop's Stortford does not derive its name from the River Stort, but the other way around. The 16th-century cartographers Christopher Saxton and William Camden named it the Stort, assuming the town of Stortford was named for its ford. The river was originally called the Stour.

The Stort Navigation  is the canalised section of the River Stort running 22 kilometres (14 mi) from Bishop's Stortford to its confluence with the Lee Navigation. It has 15 locks.

Course
The Stort rises north of Langley according to OS Explorer map 194 (GR 425358). From Langley, the Stort flows in a generally southerly direction through the villages of Clavering and Manuden and the market town of Bishop's Stortford.

It then flows past Sawbridgeworth, before it changes direction and flows west past Harlow and Roydon. It finally empties into the Lea at Feildes Weir, Hoddesdon. This 14-mile (22-km) long section was canalised in the 18th century as the Stort Navigation.

References

External links

River Stort Old Postcard images in A Guide to Old Hertfordshire
Stort River Partnership

 
Stort
Stort
Lee Valley Park
1Stort
Stort